Saburovo (Habır) is a rural locality (a village) in Yengalyshevsky Selsoviet, Chishminsky District, Bashkortostan, Russia. The population was 43 as of 2010. There are 8 streets.

Geography 
Saburovo is located 52 km southeast of Chishmy (the district's administrative centre) by road. Beketovo is the nearest rural locality.

References 

Rural localities in Chishminsky District